The 1997 Qatar Open, known as the 1997 Qatar Mobil Open for sponsorship reasons, was a men's tennis tournament played on outdoor hard courts at the Khalifa International Tennis Complex in Doha in Qatar and was part of the World Series of the 1997 ATP Tour. It was the fifth edition of the tournament and was held from 30 December 1996 until 6 January 1997. Eighth-seeded Jim Courier won the singles title.

Finals

Singles

 Jim Courier defeated  Tim Henman 7–5, 6–7(5–7), 6–2
 It was Courier's 1st title of the year and the 25th of his career.

Doubles

 Jacco Eltingh /  Paul Haarhuis defeated  Patrik Fredriksson /  Magnus Norman 6–3, 6–2
 It was Eltingh's 1st title of the year and the 33rd of his career. It was Haarhuis's 1st title of the year and the 32nd of his career.

References

External links
 Official website
 ATP tournament profile

 
Qatar Open
Qatar Open (tennis)
1997 in Qatari sport